MFC 19: Long Time Coming was a mixed martial arts event held by the Maximum Fighting Championship (MFC) on December 5th, 2008 in Enoch, Alberta.

Fight Card

See also 
 Maximum Fighting Championship
 List of Maximum Fighting Championship events
 2008 in Maximum Fighting Championship

References

19
2008 in mixed martial arts
Mixed martial arts in Canada
Sport in Alberta
2008 in Canadian sports
2008 in Alberta